Stenoecia is a genus of moths of the family Noctuidae.

Species
 Stenoecia dos (Freyer, 1838)

References
Natural History Museum Lepidoptera genus database
Stenoecia at funet

Heliothinae